Abdulaziz Hamsal (born March 1, 1987) is a full back or winger. He is known for being the tallest football player in the video game series FIFA.

References

1987 births
Living people
Association football fullbacks
Association football wingers
Najran SC players
Al-Okhdood Club players
Bisha FC players
Al-Jazira Club (Saudi Arabia) players
Mudhar Club players
Saudi Arabian footballers
Saudi Second Division players
Saudi First Division League players
Saudi Professional League players
Saudi Fourth Division players
Saudi Third Division players